The Carpathian Sich 49th Infantry Battalion, formerly known as the 49th Rifle Battalion and informally as the Carpathian Sich Separate Volunteer Battalion (is a battalion of the Ukrainian Ground Forces established in May 2022. It previously existed from 2014 to 2016.

History 
Following the beginning of the War in Donbas, Oleh Kutsyn organised a group of volunteers dedicated to providing aid to Ukrainian soldiers. In the summer of 2014, the volunteers joined the National Guard of Ukraine. On 23 May 2015, they officially became part of the Armed Forces of Ukraine. The same year, they participated in the Second Battle of Donetsk Airport, the Battle of Debaltseve, and the Battle of Marinka.

However, on 13 April 2016, the Carpathian Sich Battalion was disbanded. Kutsyn claimed he had been deceived by the leadership of the 93rd Mechanised Brigade, which it had subordinated itself to under the condition that it was permitted to remain in the Donbas. The General Staff of the Ukrainian Armed Forces disputed this, saying the volunteer battalion had been dissolved to bring the Armed Forces of Ukraine up to the standards of NATO, and that Carpathian Sich Battalion members had been given the offer to join other units.

2022 Russian invasion of Ukraine 
Following the beginning of the 2022 Russian invasion of Ukraine, Kutsyn re-founded the battalion with other former members. The new battalion fought in Kyiv Oblast, at the battles of Irpin, Bucha, Kyiv, and Brovary. Following the successful repulsion of the Kyiv Offensive by Ukrainian forces, the battalion again became an official part of the Ukrainian Armed Forces on 19 May 2022. It was then sent to the Eastern Ukraine campaign, where it fought at the Battle of Izium. There, Kutsyn was killed by Russian forces on 19 June 2022.

As of 4 January 2023, the battalion is participating in the Battle of the Svatove–Kreminna line.

References 

Military units and formations established in 2014
Military units and formations disestablished in 2016
Military units and formations established in 2022
Military units and formations of the 2022 Russian invasion of Ukraine
Battalions of Ukraine